James Henry “Jimmy” Dawkins (October 24, 1936 – April 10, 2013)  was an American Chicago blues and electric blues guitarist and singer. He is generally considered to have been a practitioner of the "West Side sound" of Chicago blues.

Career
Dawkins was born in Tchula, Mississippi. He moved to Chicago in 1955, where he worked in a box factory, started to play in local blues clubs, and gained a reputation as a session musician.

In 1969, thanks to the efforts of his friend Magic Sam, his first album, Fast Fingers, was released by Delmark Records. It won the Grand Prix du Disque from the Hot Club de France. In 1971, Delmark released his second album, All for Business, with the singer Andrew Odom and the guitarist Otis Rush.

Dawkins toured in the late 1970s, backed up by James Solberg (of Luther Allison and the Nighthawks) on guitar and Jon Preizler (the Lamont Cranston Band, Luther Allison, and Albert King), a Seattle-based Hammond B-3 organ player known for his soulful jazz-influenced style. Other musicians that toured with Dawkins in the late 1970s were Jimi Schutte (drums), Sylvester Boines (bass), Rich Kirch and Billy Flynn (guitars). Dawkins toured in Europe with this group of musicians. He also toured in Japan and recorded more albums in the United States and Europe. He contributed a column to the blues magazine Living Blues.

In the 1980s he released few recordings but started his own record label, Leric Records, and was more interested in promoting other artists, including Tail Dragger Jones, Queen Sylvia Embry, Little Johnny Christian, and Nora Jean Bruso (née Wallace).

Dawkins died of undisclosed causes on April 10, 2013, aged 76.

Discography

Solo
 Fast Fingers (1969), Delmark Records
 All for Business (1971), Delmark Records
 Jimmy Dawkins (1971)
 Tribute to Orange (1971)
 Transatlantic 770 (1972)
 Blisterstring (1976), Delmark Records
 Come Back Baby (1976), Storyville Records
 Hot Wire '81 (1981), with Rich Kirch, Sylvester Boines, and Jimi Schutte, recorded in Paris
 Jimmy and Hip: Live! (1982)
 Feel the Blues (1985)
 All Blues (1986)
 Chicago on My Mind: Living the Blues (1991), recording in 1971, Vogue Records
 Kant Sheck Dees Bluze (1992), Earwig Music Company
 Blues and Pain (1994)
 B Phur Real (1995)
 Me, My Guitar & the Blues (1997)
 Vol. 2: I Want to Know (1999), recorded in 1975, Storyville Records
 Born in Poverty (1999), recorded in 1972 & 1974, Black & Blue Records
 American Roots: Blues (2002), compilation 1994–1997
 West Side Guitar Hero (2002)
 Tell Me Baby (2004)

With other artists
 Blues Queen Sylvia & Jimmy Dawkins: Midnight Baby (1983)
 Jimmy Dawkins / Chicago Beau / Blue Ice Bragason: Blues from Iceland (1991)
 Sunnyland Slim & Big Voice Odom: Chicago Blues Festival 1974 with Jimmy Dawkins (2005)

As sideman

With Luther Allison
Love Me Mama (Delmark, 1969)
With Carey Bell
Carey Bell's Blues Harp (Delmark, 1969)

References

Sources
 Sharp, Steven, March/April 1993, 'Jimmy Dawkins: Deep Into The Feelings', Living Blues, Vol. 108

External links
Jimmy Dawkins Biography at Joes-corner.de
Jimmy Dawkins information at Fyristorg.com

1936 births
2013 deaths
People from Tchula, Mississippi
Chicago blues musicians
American blues guitarists
American male guitarists
Blues musicians from Mississippi
American blues singers
Singers from Mississippi
Delmark Records artists
Guitarists from Illinois
Guitarists from Mississippi
20th-century American guitarists
20th-century American male musicians
Black & Blue Records artists
Earwig Music artists